The Rip Curl Pro 2017 was an event of the Association of Surfing Professionals for 2017 World Surf League. This was held from 12 to 24 April at Bells Beach, (Victoria, Australia) and contested by 36 surfers. Jordy Smith beats Caio Ibelli and won the 2017 Rip Curl Pro Bell Beach.

Round 1

Round 2

Round 3

Round 4

Round 5

Quarter finals

Semi finals

Final

References

References

Surfing competitions
2017 World Surf League